The following article presents a summary of the 2007–08 association football season in Croatia, which was the 17th season of competitive football in the country.

League competitions

Croatian First Division

Croatian Second Division

Other honours